In geometry and crystallography, a stereohedron is a convex polyhedron that  fills space isohedrally, meaning that the symmetries of the tiling take any copy of the stereohedron to any other copy.

Two-dimensional analogues to the stereohedra are called planigons. Higher dimensional polytopes can also be stereohedra, while they would more accurately be called stereotopes.

Plesiohedra
A subset of stereohedra are called plesiohedrons, defined as the Voronoi cells of a symmetric Delone set.

Parallelohedrons are plesiohedra which are space-filling by translation only. Edges here are colored as parallel vectors.

Other periodic stereohedra
The catoptric tessellation contain stereohedra cells. Dihedral angles are integer divisors of 180°, and are colored by their order.

Any space-filling stereohedra with symmetry elements can be dissected into smaller identical cells which are also stereohedra. The name modifiers below, half, quarter, and eighth represent such dissections.

Other convex polyhedra that are stereohedra but not parallelohedra nor plesiohedra include the gyrobifastigium.

References
 
 B. N. Delone, N. N. Sandakova, Theory of stereohedra Trudy Mat. Inst. Steklov., 64 (1961) pp. 28–51 (Russian)
 Goldberg, Michael Three Infinite Families of Tetrahedral Space-Fillers Journal of Combinatorial Theory A, 16, pp. 348–354, 1974.
 Goldberg, Michael The space-filling pentahedra, Journal of Combinatorial Theory, Series A Volume 13, Issue 3, November 1972, Pages 437-443  PDF
 Goldberg, Michael The Space-filling Pentahedra II, Journal of Combinatorial Theory 17 (1974), 375–378. PDF
 Goldberg, Michael On the space-filling hexahedra Geom. Dedicata, June 1977, Volume 6, Issue 1, pp 99–108  PDF
 Goldberg, Michael On the space-filling heptahedra Geometriae Dedicata, June 1978, Volume 7, Issue 2, pp 175–184  PDF
 Goldberg, Michael Convex Polyhedral Space-Fillers of More than Twelve Faces. Geom. Dedicata 8, 491-500, 1979. 
 Goldberg, Michael On the space-filling octahedra, Geometriae Dedicata, January 1981, Volume 10, Issue 1, pp 323–335  PDF
 Goldberg, Michael On the Space-filling Decahedra. Structural Topology, 1982, num. Type 10-II PDF
 Goldberg, Michael On the space-filling enneahedra Geometriae Dedicata, June 1982, Volume 12, Issue 3, pp 297–306  PDF

Space-filling polyhedra